Coldplay Live 2003 is the first live album by British rock band Coldplay. It was released in November 2003 and serves as the band's second live release, following Trouble – Norwegian Live EP (2001). Featuring the concerts filmed at Sydney's Hordern Pavilion on 21 and 22 July 2003, the album was nominated for Best Long Form Music Video at the 47th Annual Grammy Awards and named one of the best releases of the year by Blender.

The song "Moses", exclusive to this record, was written about Chris Martin's wife Gwyneth Paltrow and inspired the name of their second child, Moses Bruce Anthony Martin, born in 2006. It was solicited to US alternative radio as a promotional single on 6 October 2003. The recording of "Clocks" also had a promotional radio push in countries such as Mexico and Spain.

Track listing
All tracks are written by Guy Berryman, Jonny Buckland, Will Champion and Chris Martin.

Disc one (DVD)
"Politik" (from A Rush of Blood to the Head, 2002)
"God Put a Smile upon Your Face" (from A Rush of Blood to the Head)
"A Rush of Blood to the Head" (from A Rush of Blood to the Head)
"Daylight" (from A Rush of Blood to the Head)
"Trouble" (from Parachutes, 2000)
"One I Love" (from "In My Place" single, 2002)
"Don't Panic" (from Parachutes)
"Shiver" (from Parachutes)
"See You Soon" (from The Blue Room EP, 1999)
"Everything's Not Lost" (from Parachutes)
"Moses" (previously unreleased)
"Yellow" (from Parachutes) (additional guitar by Matt McGinn)
"The Scientist" (from A Rush of Blood to the Head)
"Clocks" (from A Rush of Blood to the Head)
"In My Place" (from A Rush of Blood to the Head)
"Amsterdam" (from A Rush of Blood to the Head)
"Life Is for Living" (from Parachutes)
"Tour Diary Documentary" (Extra) 40:00

Disc two (CD)
"Politik" – 6:36 
"God Put a Smile upon Your Face" – 4:57 
"A Rush of Blood to the Head" – 6:51 
"One I Love" – 5:08 
"See You Soon" – 3:29 
"Shiver" – 5:26 
"Everything's Not Lost" – 8:48 
"Moses" – 5:29
"Yellow" – 5:36
"Clocks" – 5:33 
"In My Place" – 4:13 
"Amsterdam" – 5:22
 Interactive Photo Gallery

Personnel
 Chris Martin – lead vocals, piano, acoustic guitar, rhythm guitar
 Jonny Buckland – lead guitar, backing vocals, harmonica
 Guy Berryman – bass, harmonica, synthesizer
 Will Champion – drums, percussion, piano, backing vocals

Charts

Weekly charts

Year-end charts

Certifications and sales

DVD

Album

Notes

References

External links

Coldplay live albums
Albums produced by Ken Nelson (British record producer)
Live video albums
2003 live albums
2003 video albums
Capitol Records live albums
Parlophone live albums
Capitol Records video albums
Parlophone video albums
Coldplay video albums
Concert films